Rocklane is an unincorporated community in Clark Township, Johnson County, Indiana.

History
A post office was established at Rocklane in 1873, and remained in operation until it was discontinued in 1902. The name Rocklane might indicate that their soil is rocky.

Geography

References

Unincorporated communities in Johnson County, Indiana
Unincorporated communities in Indiana
Indianapolis metropolitan area